Blood on the Dance Floor may refer to:

Blood on the Dance Floor: HIStory in the Mix, a 1997 album by Michael Jackson
"Blood on the Dance Floor" (song), a 1997 song by Michael Jackson from the album
Blood on the Dance Floor (band), a dance-pop musical group established in 2007